Juan Carlos "Ranchero" Ramírez (born April 24, 1977) is a Mexican professional boxer. He is the former NABF featherweight and WBO Inter-Continental featherweight champion.

Professional career

WBC Featherweight Championship
In August 1998, Ramírez dropped a technical decision to Luisito Espinosa. The bout was for the WBC Featherweight title and stopped due to an accidental headbutt.

WBC Super Bantamweight Championship
On May 8, 1999 Juan lost to WBC Super Bantamweight Champion, Érik Morales at the Las Vegas Hilton Hotel in Las Vegas, Nevada.

References

External links

Sportspeople from Ciudad Juárez
Boxers from Chihuahua (state)
Lightweight boxers
1977 births
Living people
Mexican male boxers